N.B.S. Institute Of Polytechnic is located at Ausa in Latur district of Maharashtra state, India. The college was founded in 2009.

References

Universities and colleges in Maharashtra
Latur district
Educational institutions established in 2009
2009 establishments in Maharashtra